West of England is a combined authority area in South West England. It is made up of the Bristol, South Gloucestershire, and Bath and North East Somerset unitary authorities. The combined authority is led by the Mayor of the West of England Dan Norris.

Background

The term has been used in the Bristol and Bath area since at least the 18th century.  The Royal Bath and West of England Society was named the Bath and West of England Society in 1790.  The Royal West of England Academy received its present title in 1913.  More recently the term has been used by organisations such as the West of England Partnership, Connexions West of England, and the West of England Sport Trust, as a synonym for the former Avon area, which existed as a local government unit between 1974 and 1996. Some aspects of transport planning and policy are coordinated using the Travelwest logo.

The West of England Combined Authority is a combined authority for the area, originally intended to comprise the local authorities of the former county of Avon, including Bristol, South Gloucestershire, Bath and North East Somerset and North Somerset,  but North Somerset declined to participate.  The combined authority is led by a Mayor, following the first election in May 2017.  The government's stated vision is to create a "Western Powerhouse" analogous to the government's Northern Powerhouse concept. It is said that the proposal could bring nearly £1 billion of investment to the region.

The term is also used by the University of the West of England, the Royal West of England Academy, and by voluntary groups and clubs such as the West of England Bridge Club, all of which are based in or near Bristol.

See also
Avon (county)
Greater Bristol
West of England Combined Authority
West Country
South West England
 Great Western Cities

References

West Country
Avon (county)
Regions of England
Combined authorities
Politics of Bristol
Politics of Bath and North East Somerset
Politics of South Gloucestershire District